Mr. Black or Mr Black may refer to:

Television
 Mr. Black (TV series), an Australian television comedy series
 Mr Black, a character in NX Files, a Canadian online action martial arts video series
 Mr. Black, a character from the 2005 animated television series Johnny Test
 Mr. Black, an evil one-time character from the episode of The Simpsons, "Kamp Krusty"
 Black Cat Detective (also known as Mr. Black), a Chinese animated TV series

Film
Mr. Black: Green Star, a 2015 animated film from China based on the Black Cat Detective TV series
 Mr. Black Mr. White, a 2008 feature film in Hindi
 Goodbye Mr. Black, a 2016 television series from South Korea based on the manhwa of the same title
 Dr. Black, Mr. Hyde, a 1976 blaxploitation horror film loosely inspired by the novella Strange Case of Dr Jekyll and Mr Hyde by Robert Louis Stevenson

Other uses
 Mr. Black, an unseen character in the game Grand Theft Auto: Vice City
 "The Reverend Mr. Black", a song from 1963 by Billy Edd Wheeler, Mike Stoller, and Jerry Leiber